The 2nd AARP Movies for Grownups Awards, presented by AARP the Magazine, honored films released in 2002 made by people over the age of 50. As was customary for the awards at this point, there was no awards ceremony; instead, the winners were announced in 2003's May/June issue of the magazine. Richard Gere won the award for Breakaway Performance for Chicago.

Awards

Winners and Nominees

Winners are listed first, highlighted in boldface, and indicated with a double dagger.

Breakaway Performance
 Richard Gere: "Who'd have thought that behind those American Gigolo eyes and that Officer and a Gentleman chin hid the soul of a song-and-dance man? He'll never make us forget Astaire—but we'll never think of Gere in the same way, either."

Runners Up
 Maggie Smith for Divine Secrets of the Ya-Ya Sisterhood
 Christopher Walken for Catch Me If You Can
 Robin Williams for One Hour Photo

Films with multiple nominations and wins

References

AARP Movies for Grownups Awards
AARP